Myrtilla Avery (1869–1959) was an American classical scholar focused on Medieval art, former chair of Department of Art at Wellesley College and director of the Farnsworth Art Museum from 1930–1937.

Biography 
Avery graduated in 1891 from Wellesley College, majoring in Greek. After in which she started taking classes at University at Albany, SUNY, while working in the university library. By 1895 she earned a bachelor's degree in Library Science. Her Master of Arts degree from Wellesley was in 1913 and a doctorate in art history from Radcliffe College in 1927.

Avery offered one of the earliest classes in museum studies at the Farnsworth Art Museum and by 1915 she introduced the first art history classes at Wellesley. She became the chair of the Wellesley art department in 1929, succeeding Alice Van Vechten Brown. After serving on Wellesley's faculty for 25 years, she retired from Wellesley in 1937 and was named professor emeritus.

After retiring she dedicated her energies to volunteering for the American Council of Learned Societies. In 1943, the council formed the Committee on the Protection of Cultural Treasures in War Areas and they worked on indexing the most important artworks in Nazi-occupied countries.

See also
Monuments, Fine Arts, and Archives
List of Monuments, Fine Arts, and Archives (MFAA) personnel
Women in the art history field

References

1869 births
1959 deaths
Wellesley College alumni
Wellesley College faculty
University at Albany, SUNY alumni
Radcliffe College alumni
Monuments men
Women art historians